Arthur Beecher Carles (March 9, 1882 – 1952) was an American Modernist painter.

Biography
Carles was born in Philadelphia, Pennsylvania, and studied at the Pennsylvania Academy of the Fine Arts between 1900 and 1907. He studied with Thomas Pollock Anshutz, Hugh Breckenridge, Henry McCarter, Cecilia Beaux, and William Merritt Chase. In 1907 he traveled to France where he remained until 1910. In France, he greatly admired the works of Cézanne and Matisse, and became close friends with John Marin and Eduard Steichen. He displayed six landscapes in the Salon d'Automne of 1908.

In March 1910 his work was included in the “Younger American Painters” show held at Alfred Stieglitz’s New York City gallery, 291. Stieglitz gave Carles his first one-man show at 291 in January 1912.

He returned to France from June to October 1912 and exhibited at the 1912 Salon d'Automne. After his return to America he exhibited at the Armory Show of 1913. He taught at the Pennsylvania Academy in Philadelphia from 1917 to 1925 and taught privately afterwards.  He continued a mentor relationship with many PAFA students through the 1930s, including the artist Norman Carton. His later years were marked by bouts of alcoholism. In December 1941 he suffered a stroke that left him an invalid until his death in 1952. His daughter Mercedes Matter, also an artist and the founder of the New York Studio School, was married to photographer and designer Herbert Matter.

Legacy

Art historian Barbara Ann Boese Wolanin describes Carles as a link between Philadelphia and Paris, and as "one of the most brilliant colorists in the history of American art." She says of him: "His paintings range in style from tonalism and Impressionism to prophecies of Abstract expressionism. His approach was intuitive. An expressionist by nature, he was guided by feeling, believing that 'accuracy is an intellectual quality while art is an affair of the emotions'".

Carles was given a retrospective exhibition at the Pennsylvania Academy in 1953, and again in 1959 at the Graham Gallery in New York.

Notes

References

 Wolanin, Barbara Ann Boese, 2000, "The Paintings of Arthur B. Carles", American Art Review vol XII issue 2: pp. 164–173

Further reading 

 Dr. Barbara Ann Boese Wolanin (2000). The Orchestration of Color: The Paintings of Arthur B. Carles. New York: Hollis Taggart Galleries.
Jane Piper, “Remembering Arthur B. Carles,” Arts (March 1988) 73-75.

External links

 Arthur B. Carles Biography: Hollis Taggart Galleries
 Arthur B. Carles Documentary: American INSIGHT

1882 births
1952 deaths
20th-century American painters
American male painters
Burials at West Laurel Hill Cemetery
Modern painters
Pennsylvania Academy of the Fine Arts alumni
Pennsylvania Academy of the Fine Arts faculty
Painters from Pennsylvania
20th-century American male artists